Haploview is a commonly used bioinformatics software which is designed to analyze and visualize patterns of linkage disequilibrium (LD) in genetic data. Haploview can also perform association studies, choosing tagSNPs and estimating haplotype frequencies. Haploview is developed and maintained by Dr. Mark Daly's lab at the MIT/Harvard Broad Institute.

Haploview currently supports the following functionalities:

 LD & haplotype block analysis 
 Haplotype population frequency estimation 
 Single SNP and haplotype association tests 
 Permutation testing for association significance
 Implementation of Paul de Bakker's Tagger tag SNP selection algorithm
 Automatic download of phased genotype data from HapMap
 Visualization and plotting of PLINK whole genome association results including advanced filtering options

References

External links
 Haploview Homepage

Genetics software